Anthony Farrell (born 17 January 1969) is an English former professional rugby league footballer.

Background
Anthony Farrell was born in Huddersfield, West Riding of Yorkshire, England.

Playing career
Whilst in his first year at Halifax the sacking of Tony Anderson opened a new career for "Faz" as he was asked to become temporary coach until the end of the year. After saving the club from relegation the following season Farrell took the club within a whisker of a place in the grand final. Losing out to Castleford Tigers. The year after was less successful for Farrell though, after a poor series of results including a club record defeat by the Hull Kingston Rovers, "Faz" eventually lost his job.

References

1969 births
Living people
England national rugby league team players
English rugby league coaches
English rugby league players
Halifax R.L.F.C. coaches
Halifax R.L.F.C. players
Huddersfield Giants players
Leeds Rhinos players
Rugby league players from Huddersfield
Rugby league props
Rugby league second-rows
Sheffield Eagles (1984) players
Wales national rugby league team players
Widnes Vikings players
Yorkshire rugby league team players